This is the discography for American country musician George Hamilton IV.

Albums

Singles 

A"Now and for Always" reached No. 12 in Canada.
B"Teen Commandments" reached No.14 on the Canadian charts.
C"Abilene" also peaked at No. 4 on Hot Adult Contemporary Tracks and No. 9 in Canada.
D"Canadian Pacific" also peaked at No. 9 on the RPM Top Singles chart in Canada.

Guest singles

B-sides

References

External links
 

Country music discographies
Discographies of American artists